Shake It is the third extended play by South Korean girl group Sistar. It was released on June 22, 2015 by Starship Entertainment and distributed by LOEN Entertainment.

Background and release
In May 2015, it was revealed that Sistar were coming back at the end of June. On June 2, Sistar released teaser photos through their official Twitter account. Three days after, they released another set of teaser photos and revealed to come back on June 22 with an extended play. Four days later, they released another set of teaser photos. On June 11, Sistar confirmed that the title track of their new extended play is called "Shake It", produced by Duble Sidekick who produced their previous title tracks "Give It to Me" and "Loving U", along with an official teaser photo. Three days later, Sistar released a second official teaser photo. On the next day, Sistar released another teaser photo. On June 17, Sistar released the official music video teaser for "Shake It".

On June 22, Sistar released Shake It and its title track of the same name along with its music video. On the following day, Sistar released a dance practice video for "Shake It".

Promotion
The promotions of title track "Shake It" started on June 25, 2015 on Mnet's M Countdown. The song was also promoted on music shows The Show, Music Bank, Show! Music Core and Inkigayo. On July 2, Sistar won their first trophy award on M Countdown for "Shake It". They continue winning on July 3 on Music Bank, July 5 on Inkigayo, July 8 on Show Champion, and July 10th on Music Bank. They ended their promotions after promoting for a month.

Track listing

Charts

Sales and certifications

Music program awards

References

2015 EPs
Korean-language EPs
Sistar EPs
Starship Entertainment EPs